María José Montiel (born 24 June 1968) is a Spanish mezzo-soprano opera singer born in Madrid. In 2011 she was awarded the Premio Teatro Campoamor for her interpretation of Carmen by the Fundación Premio Líricos Teatro Campoamor.

Life and career
Montiel was born in Madrid. She graduated in vocal performance at the Madrid Conservatory where she studied under Pedro Lavirgen and Ana María Iriarte, before moving to Vienna for further training with Sena Jurinac and Olivera Miljakovic. She studied law at the Autonomous University of Madrid, where she also gained a postgraduate diploma in History and Science of Music.

She has sung the lead role in Carmen in Italy, Switzerland, Germany, France, Spain and Japan. She was a soloist in the Verdi Requiem conducted by Riccardo Chailly and performed in the concert halls of Vienna, Frankfurt, Milan and Budapest, as well as the NHK Hall in Tokyo and the Leipzig Gewandhaus.

She has sung at Carnegie Hall in New York, the Kennedy Center in Washington, D. C., Salle Pleyel and Paris Opera, Théâtre du Capitole in Toulouse, Finlandia Hall in Helsinki, Musikverein, Konzerthaus and Vienna State Opera, Bern Theatre, Bregenz Festival, Sydney Town Hall, La Scala, Teatro Regio di Parma, Teatro Verdi in Pisa, Teatro Comunale di Bologna, La Fenice, Teatro Verdi in Trieste, La Monnaie in Brussels, New National Theatre Tokyo. In Spain she has performed in the Teatro Real and National Auditorium of Music in Madrid, Gran Teatro del Liceo and Palau de la Música Catalana in Barcelona, Palau de la Música in Valencia, Teatro Villamarta in Jerez, Palacio de la Ópera in A Coruña.

At the re-opening of the Teatro Real in Madrid, she sang the lead role in Manuel de Falla's opera La vida breve, alongside the tenor Jaume Aragall. She also performed in Usandizaga's Las golondrinas at the same theatre, where she also participated in the SGAE Centenary Gala with Montserrat Caballé and Alfredo Kraus and in the gala to celebrate the 25th anniversary of the Spanish Constitution. She sang with Plácido Domingo at the re-opening of the Teatro Avenida in Buenos Aires and she performed alongside him in Federico Moreno Torroba's zarzuela, Luisa Fernanda in its first performance at La Scala, before going on tour with the work to the Washington National Opera, Teatro Real de Madrid, Los Angeles Opera and the Theater an der Wien in Vienna.

Repertoire 
 Vincenzo Bellini
 I Capuleti e i Montecchi, Romeo
 Norma, Adalgisa
 Alban Berg
 Wozzeck, Marie
 Georges Bizet
 Carmen, Carmen
 Francesco Cilea
 Adriana Lecouvreur, Principessa
 Gaetano Donizetti
 La favorite, Leonore
 Maria Stuarda, Elisabetta
 Lucrezia Borgia, Maffio Orsini
 Jules Massenet
 Werther, Charlotte
 Don Quichotte, Dulcinea
 Wolfgang Amadeus Mozart
 La clemenza di Tito, Sesto
 Così fan tutte, Dorabella
 Amilcare Ponchielli
 La Gioconda, Laura
 Gioachino Rossini
 The Barber of Seville, Rosina
 Richard Strauss
 Ariadne auf Naxos, Komponist
 Der Rosenkavalier, Oktavian
 Giuseppe Verdi
 Don Carlo, Eboli
 Aida, Amneris
 Il trovatore, Azucena

Her concert repertoire includes Les nuits d'été and Scenes from Faust by Hector Berlioz, Gustav Mahler's Lieder eines fahrenden Gesellen and second and eighth symphonies, Verdi's Requiem, Vivaldi's Gloria, Beethoven's Ninth Symphony, Messa di Gloria and Stabat Mater by Rossini, Shéhérazade by Maurice Ravel, and Alto Rhapsody by Brahms.

 Prizes 
She has been awarded the Lucrecia Arana award, the SGAE Federico Romero prize, the RNE Ojo Crítico award, the CEOE prize and the Spanish Coca-Cola Foundation award for best singer. In 2007 the Community of Madrid awarded her with the Culture Prize in the music section.

 Discography 
Her recordings number a total of 17 discs, for labels such as Dial, BIS, RTVE, Ensayo, Fundación Author, Decca, Deutsche Grammophon and Stradivarius.

References

 External links 
 
Interview in La Verdad'', Murcia, 2010
Interview in Mujeres.es, 2011

Living people
1968 births
21st-century Spanish women opera singers
Spanish mezzo-sopranos
Operatic mezzo-sopranos
20th-century Spanish women opera singers